Diego Valdés may refer to:

Diego Valdés (athlete) (born 1983), Chilean Olympic sprinter
Diego Valdés (Colombian footballer) (born 1981), Colombian football midfielder
Diego Valdés (Chilean footballer) (born 1994), Chilean football midfielder
Diego "Mudo" Valdez (born 1993), Paraguayan footballer